The Palm Springs Angels were a minor league baseball team of the Class A California League from 1986 to 1993 and an affiliate of the California Angels. Following the 1993 season the franchise relocated to Lake Elsinore, California to become the Lake Elsinore Storm.

History
Following the 1985 season, the Redwood Pioneers were relocated to Palm Springs. Redwood had been the California Angels California League affiliate. The Angels had used Palm Springs as a spring training location. Upon moving to the desert the team adopted the name of their parent club to become the Palm Springs Angels.

Although average game attendance was below average of the league in the late 1980s, the P.S. Angels picked up on fans in the early 1990s, when stadium attendance records surpassed the 100,000 mark in 1992 and again in 1993.

The last team owner, Ken Stickney in The Desert Sun interview stated the P.S. Angels' move was due to a lack of city council support to approve a new minor league ballpark, after the California Angels left for a new spring training facility in Tempe, Arizona.

Former Palm Spring Angels players include Pete Rose Jr., Dante Bichette, J. T. Snow, Tim Salmon, Garret Anderson, Troy Percival and Jim Edmonds.

Notable alumni

 Garret Anderson (1992) 3 x MLB All-Star

 Floyd Bannister (1991) 2 x MLB All-Star

 Dante Bichette (1986) 4 x MLB All-Star

 Bob Boone (1987) 7 x Gold Glove; 4 x MLB All-Star

 John Candelaria (1986) MLB All-Star; 1977 NL ERA Leader

 Jim Edmonds (1990–1991) 8 x Gold Glove; 4 x MLB All-Star

 Mike Fetters (1987)

 Kelly Gruber (1993) 2 x MLB All-Star

 Bryan Harvey (1986) 2 x MLB All-Star

 Roberto Hernandez (1989) 2 x MLB All-Star

 Kirk McCaskill (1987)

 Mark McLemore (1988, 1990) 

 Mike Marshall (1991) MLB All-Star

 Donnie Moore (1987-1988) MLB All-Star

 Dan Petry (1988) MLB All-Star

 Troy Percival (1992) 4 x MLB All-Star

Eduardo Perez (1992) 

 Bryan Price (1986)

 Tim Salmon (1990) 1993 AL Rookie of the Year

 Paul Sorrento (1986, 1988)

 Lee Stevens (1987)

 Mark Sweeney (1993) All-Time MLB Pinch Hit RBI leader

 Fernando Valenzuela (1991) 6 x MLB All-Star; 1981 NL Rookie of the Year; 1981 NL Cy Young Award

References

External links
Baseball Reference

Defunct California League teams
Palm Springs, California
Defunct baseball teams in California
Professional baseball teams in California
California Angels minor league affiliates
1986 establishments in California
1993 disestablishments in California
Baseball teams established in 1986
Baseball teams disestablished in 1993